The Samsung NX 50-150mm F2.8 S OIS is an interchangeable telezoom lens announced by Samsung on September 15, 2014. It has a constant wide aperture of f/2.8.

References
http://www.dpreview.com/products/samsung/lenses/samsung_50-150_2p8_s/specifications

50-150
Camera lenses introduced in 2014